This is a list of Estonian television related events from 1998.

Events
24 January - Koit Toome is selected to represent Estonia at the 1998 Eurovision Song Contest with his song "Mere lapsed". He is selected to be the fourth Estonian Eurovision entry during Eurolaul held at the ETV Studios in Tallinn.

Debuts

Television shows

1990s
Õnne 13 (1993–present)

Ending this year

Births

Deaths